Polyot is a transliteration of the Russian term Полёт (meaning Flight) and can be transliterated as Polyot, Poljot or Polet. Polyot can refer to the following:

Polet Airlines, an airline based in Voronezh, Russia
Poljot, a brand of watches from the USSR, and now Russia
Polyot (rocket), an interim orbital carrier rocket from the USSR
Federal State Unitary Enterprise "Production Corporation "Polyot", a company based in Omsk, responsible for manufacture of the Antonov An-3 aircraft and Cosmos-3M space launch vehicle, amongst others
Polyot-Sirena, the major Russian Global Distribution System
Polyot, Russian aerospace journal

See also
 :ru:Полёт (значения)